Kristen Dunphy is an Australian television screenwriter and producer. She is best known as creator, co-writer and co-executive producer of Wakefield, which screened on ABC TV in 2021.

Career 
Dunphy's career in film and television began when producer Sandra Levy employed her to work as assistant to Gillian Armstrong, who was directing the 1987 film, High Tide. When Levy became head of drama at ABC TV she employed Dunphy as a screenwriter on G.P. (1992–1996), The Ferals (1995) and Heartbreak High (1995–1997).

Dunphy, as creator, co-writer and joint executive producer, began developing the eight-part serial, Wakefield in 2012. During its production in 2020 she worked as joint showrunner. Wakefield screened on ABC TV in 2021 and received five AACTA Award nominations.

Awards and recognition 
Dunphy won her first AWGIE in 2003 for Best Television Series Episode for episode 14 of White Collar Blue (Network 10/Knapman Wyld). She won the 2008 AWGIE for Best Television Series Drama for Eastwest 101 (SBS/Knapman Wyld) and the 2012 AWGIE for Best Mini-Series Television Drama for The Straits (ABC/Matchbox) 2012. She was awarded the Foxtel Fellowship in 2012 for her "significant contribution to the Australian cultural landscape made by television writing".

Selected filmography

Television series

Films

References

External links 

 
 

Living people
Year of birth missing (living people)
Australian television writers
Australian women screenwriters
Australian women television writers